Charles Musonda or Charly Musonda may refer to:
Charly Musonda (footballer, born 1969), Zambian footballer
Charly Musonda (footballer, born 1996), Belgian footballer